Clemente Ascanio Sandri-Trotti (died 20 April 1675) was a Roman Catholic prelate who served as Bishop of Fossano (1658–1675).

Biography
On 8 July 1658, Clemente Ascanio Sandri-Trotti was appointed during the papacy of Pope Alexander VII as Bishop of Fossano.
On 28 July 1658, he was consecrated bishop by Antonio Barberini, Archbishop of Reims, with Giovanni Battista Scanaroli, Titular Bishop of Sidon, and Lorenzo Gavotti, Bishop Emeritus of Ventimiglia, serving as co-consecrators. 
He served as Bishop of Fossano until his death on 20 April 1675.

References

External links and additional sources
 (for Chronology of Bishops) 
 (for Chronology of Bishops) 

17th-century Italian Roman Catholic bishops
1675 deaths
Bishops appointed by Pope Alexander VII